Amos Bar (October 15, 1931 – March 15, 2011), also known as "Possa", was an Israeli author, teacher, and editor. Most of his books are for children and young adults.

Biography
Amos Bar was born to Sarah and Pinhas Barber in moshav Tel Adashim, in the Jezreel Valley, Israel. At age 9, his family relocated to Tel Aviv. His early life experiences are richly interlaced in his books. After graduating from high school in Tel Aviv, he enlisted in the IDF and served in Nahlayim Mul Aza ("Nahal soldiers opposite Gaza"), the country's first Nahal settlement, which later became kibbutz Nahal Oz. In 1951, he joined Kibbutz Revivim in the Negev. His first book The Little Tractor Driver was written in 1958, following his experiences as a farmer in the kibbutz fields. He continued to publish numerous children's books, stories and children's magazines, radio plays and teleplays for children on radio and television. After graduating from the kibbutz seminary college and from Tel Aviv University, he was a teacher and an educator for many years.

In 1978, he assumed the editor-in-chief role of "Pashosh", a nature magazine for children published by the Society for the Protection of Nature in Israel, and remained its editor for 24 years. He also served as the editor of children's books in publishing houses: Schocken Books, Hakibbutz Hameuchad -Sifriat Poalim Publishing Group, and Kinneret Zmora-Bitan Dvir. Throughout the last two decades of his life he lived with his family in an Israeli community village, and held educational sessions with children and teenagers throughout Israel.

Amos Bar (Possah) died on March 15, 2011. He was the father of six and grandfather of four.

His work 
Amos Bar's books are inspired by his childhood experiences in the Land of Israel, its landscapes, and animals. His writing is characterized by a personal, smiling, and rogue style – seasoned with nostalgia and optimism. His strong affection for his characters is highly apparent in his books: 
"Sometimes, early in the morning, for the sound of birdsong, I go back to the days of my childhood, seeing the sights of the world through the eyes of a child, hearing the sounds with child ears, and feeling everything with a child's heart. I instantly empathize with everything I tell about, from a tree and a flower to a bird, a deer or a dwarf; while writing I see them alive and perform tricks, hear them talk as human beings, and there is nothing I can do but write or tell what I see and feel ", described Amos his work process. "My childhood stories are written quickly and without difficulty. I simply remember clearly what happened to since I started to walk."

Awards 
 In 1972, his book "I'm Running out of The Horse" was included in the list of honor of Hans Christian Andersen Award.
 In 1978, he won the Lamdan Prize for his book "Poretz Ha-Machsomim" ("Blockade Runner"), Sreberk, 1977.
 In 1993, he won the Ze'ev Award for his work "HaMeshoreret MeKineret'" ("The Poet of Sea of Galilee").

 Books 
 The Little Tractor Driver (HaTractora'ee HaKatan, 1958)
  Fishing Fish (DaGeem DaGeem, 1961)
 Rotem and the Magic Hair (Rotem Ve Se'Harat HaKsameem, 1961) – written for his oldest daughter's birthday
 The Legend of the Awakening Sea (HaGadat Ha'Yam Ha'Mitorer, 1963)
 The Ants Hill (GiVat Ha'Nemaleem, 1967)
 I'm Running out of The Horse (Nigmar Lee HaSoos, 1972)
 Dews in the Negev (Tlalim BaNegev, 1972)
 The Tales of TomerOdeDana (Halilot TomerOdeDana, 1975)
 Blockade Runner (Poretz Ha-Machsomim, 1972)  (Hebrew)
 The Negev Patrol (Sayeret Ha'Negev, 1978)
 The rebellion at the Zoo (Ha'Mered Be'Pinat Ha'Hai, 1979)
 Burning Ship at Tel-Aviv shore (Oneeya Bo'Eret Be'Hof Tel Aviv, 1980)
 Stories about Birds (Sipurim Al TziPorim, 1983)
 The Jumping Champion and the Car Counter(Aloof HaKfitzot Ve Sofer HaMehoneeyot, 1988)
 The Poet of Sea of Galilee (HaMeshoreret MeKineret, 1983) – included in Israel's Ministry of Education Reading Recommndation List of 2010–11.
 First 100 trips (Me'ah Teeyulim Rishoneem, 1986)
 One Dog, Two kids, Three chicks(Kelev e'Had, Shney Yeladeem, Shloshah Efro'Heem, 1996)
 Legend Flowers (PirHai HaGadah, 1995)
 Legend Birds (Tziporei HaGadah, 1997)
 Legend Land (Eretz HaGadah, 1997)
 Where Have You Come From, Pretty Butterfly? (Me'na'yeen Bata, Parpar YaFe?, 1999)
 Where Have You Come From, Cute Bunny? (Eih Bata La'Olam, Arnavon NehMahd?,2000)

 Editorial works 
 Pashosh Children Magazineעיתון פשוש (Pashosh) (by SPNI – Chief editor for 24 years
 They See, but Can't Be Seen by Pinhas Amitay (HaRo'eem Ve Einam Nireem, 1983)
 Adventures with Plants by Pinhas Amitay (HarPatka'ot Eem TzmaHeem, 1983)
 Insects at Home and in the Garden by Pinhas Amitay (HaRakeem Baba'eet Ve Ba'Hatzer, 1983)

 Translation works 
 Spot's Birthday (Hebrew) by Eric Hill, translated and edited by Amos Bar (Yom Hooledet Le Pinookee, 1984)
 Spot's Noisy Walk (Hebrew)''' by Eric Hill, translated and edited by Amos Bar (Pinookee Yotzeh Le Tiyool'', 1984)

References

External links 
 Photos of Amos Bar in Wikimedia
 Amos Bar  in DafDaf (Hebrew) – Author of the month, March 2011

1931 births
2011 deaths
Tel Aviv University alumni
Jewish Israeli writers
Israeli children's writers
Israeli editors
Israeli educators
Israeli novelists
Hebrew-language writers
20th-century novelists